The Hans Stieber Prize is a promotional prize for composers of serious and light music, which is awarded by the fiduciary trust Hans Stieber Foundation of the Landesverband Sachsen-Anhalt  based in Halle (Saale).

It was donated after Stieber's death by his widow Gertl Stieber in 1977 from his inheritance and awarded annually until 1989 to mainly young composers of the GDR. After the Peaceful Revolution, Stieber's heirs asserted a replevin regarding the foundation's assets, which meant that the award had to be suspended for the time being.

The latter now offered the prize every two to four years as part of a competition for young composers as well as for musicologists publishing in the field of Neue Musik. It has since been awarded as part of the contemporary music festival Hallische Musiktage.

Competition rules 
The competition conditions were adapted in the course of the 2000s. Applicants up to the age of 23 or 25 with residence in the Federal Republic of Germany can take part. In order to deepen Germany's relationship with Eastern Europe and the CIS states, the residence criterion was then dropped for these participants.

An independent Jury selects the prize winners from anonymous scores. It is composed of the Board of Trustees of the Hans Stieber Foundation (chair: Willi Vogl, later Bernhard Schneyer), other appointed jurors and the advisory jury member Thomas Buchholz. The members are usually composers (among others Günter Neubert) and conductors.

The divisible prize money amounts to 1,000 euros (previously 2,000 D-Mark). Furthermore, prizes in kind will be awarded, including participation in a summer course of the Composers' Class Saxony-Anhalt. The award ceremony takes place within the framework of the Hallische Musiktage. For this purpose, a festive concert will be held at the Handel House in Halle.

Prize winners

1977–1989

Since 2000

Notes

References

Further reading 
 Axel Schiederjürgen (Red.): Kürschners Musiker-Handbuch. Solisten, Dirigenten, Komponisten, Hochschullehrer. 5th edition. Saur, Munich 2006, .
 Manfred Weiss: Hallische Musikgeschichte: Erinnerungen an Hans Stieber. Festrede anlässlich der Verleihung des Hans-Stieber-Preises 2000 gehalten am 26.11.2000 im Händel-Haus von Prof. Manfred Weiss. In Händel-Hausmitteilungen, 3/2000, .

External links 
 Hans-Stieber-Preis Verband Deutscher Komponisten, Landesverband Sachsen-Anhalt
 Hans-Stieber-Preis. Deutsches Musikinformationszentrum

German music awards
Awards established in 1977